CJWF-FM,  branded as Windsor's Country 95.9 & 92.7, is a Windsor, Ontario radio station. owned and operated by Blackburn Radio. CJWF broadcasts a country format at 95.9 FM, with limited simulcasting in Leamington, Ontario at 92.7FM.

History

Windsor's FM/Country 95-9

CJWF was licensed on May 9, 2008. The station began test broadcasts on the night of September 22, 2009 in the wake of 106.7 The Fox flipping from country to rhythmic adult contemporary, along with appeals for the reporting of technical problems with reception. The station officially launched on the morning of November 16, 2009 at 8am as Windsor's FM 95.9. The first song played was "Welcome to the Future" by Brad Paisley.

On September 7, 2010 the station rebranded itself as "Country 95.9, The Motor Cities Country". Later that month on September 22, 2010, the state began broadcasting station information, which can be seen on Radio Data System-enabled radios. From November 26 to December 26, 2010, the station switched to an all Christmas Country format for the holidays.

On July 31, 2012, at 5am, after a mass budget cut at Blackburn Radio, sister station 92.7 Max-FM dropped its variety hits format and began simulcasting with CJWF as Windsor's' Country 95.9 & 92.7.

As such, CJWF is one of three stations (the others being CFCO and CIMX-FM) heard in Detroit that plays Canadian country that is not played by stations in the United States.

References

External links
 Windsor's Country 95.9 & 92.7
 

Jwf-Fm
Jwf-Fm
Jwf-Fm
Radio stations established in 2008
2008 establishments in Ontario